Heterofullerenes are classes of fullerenes, at least one carbon atom is replaced by another element. Based on spectroscopy, substitutions have been reported with boron (borafullerenes), nitrogen (azafullerenes), oxygen, arsenic, germanium, phosphorus, silicon, iron, copper, nickel, rhodium and iridium.
Reports on isolated heterofullerenes are limited to those based on nitrogen  and oxygen.

References

Fullerenes